Sauce Labs is an American cloud-hosted, web and mobile application automated testing platform company based in San Francisco, California.

Background
Sauce Labs was founded in August 2008. Huggins was named by InfoWorld as one of the top CTOs of 2010 for his work on Sauce OnDemand.

Sauce Labs allows users to run tests in the cloud on more than 700 different browser platform, operating system and device combinations, providing a comprehensive test infrastructure for automated and manual testing of desktop and mobile applications using Selenium, Appium and JavaScript unit testing frameworks. There is no VM setup or maintenance required, live breakpoints are accessible while the tests are running which enables you to investigate a problem manually. Sauce Labs also provides a secure testing protocol, Sauce Connect, for testing applications behind customer firewalls.

In 2013, Sauce Labs was recommended by Adobe after it closed its BrowserLab testing platform for web applications. It also supports the Firebug plug-in for Mozilla Firefox. Sauce Labs is also the first platform to support Automated Testing for Microsoft Edge.

In
2015, the company was named by the San Francisco Business Times as one of the top
100 fastest growing private companies in the Bay Area for a second consecutive year, reporting 3-year revenue growth of 472%. In 2015, Sauce Labs secured an additional $15 million in Series D expansion funding from investor Toba Capital.

In 2016, Sauce Labs announced it had raised a $70 million Series E round from Centerview Capital Technology, IVP, and Adams Street Partners. In December 2016, the company announced the acquisition of Test Object, a real device mobile app testing platform.

In 2017, SD Times wrote that Sauce Labs offers more than 800 combinations of different operating systems, browsers, and real devices available for testing, and that the company had just announced the Sauce plugin for Microsoft Visual Studio Team Services (VSTS) that automates the build process. The publication later reported on the release of Sauce Labs Test Analytics, a solution that expands data analytics and enables teams test faster, smarter, and more efficiently. Sauce Labs was also named for the fourth consecutive year to the San Francisco Business Times top 100 fastest growing private companies in the Bay Area. In the same year, Sauce Labs was named to the Inc 5000 fastest growing companies for the 2nd consecutive year

Sauce Labs was also named by IDC as a leader in the IDC MarketScape: Worldwide Mobile Testing and Digital Quality 2017-2018 Vendor Assessment - Enabling Digital Transformation via Quality Solution (doc # US40344615, FEBRUARY 2018) and by Forrester Research as "developers' choice for cross-browser and mobile testing in the cloud".

In 2019, the company announced it had raised $50 million in growth funding from Riverwood Capital. In April, 2019 Sauce Labs announced an addition to its platform, Sauce Performance, providing developers with the ability to measure application performance metrics early in the software development phase. These performance metrics include time to first meaningful paint, time to first interactive, page weight and speed Index. The product uses algorithms to establish a baseline that can be used for regression testing. The company also announced in April that it had acquired Screener.io, a provider of cloud-based automated visual regression testing, including Storybook Component testing.

In October 2019, Sauce Labs appointed Aled Miles as new CEO of the company, in replacement of Charles Ramsey, who had been leading the company for 5 years. On December 12, 2019, the company announced that it has appointed industry veteran John Kelly as Chief Technology Officer.

In January 2020, Sauce Labs announced that Joe Amadea had been named Chief Revenue Officer; Matt Wyman was appointed as Chief Product Officer, and Matt Bruun, as Senior Vice President, EMEA. Following these appointments Sauce Labs announced that Justin Dolly had joined the company as Chief Security Officer on February 12, 2020.

In December, 2020 the company completed the acquisition of API Fortress, a provider of automated APP testing solutions for developers and DevOps teams. In February 2021, Sauce Labs announced that they had entered into a definitive agreement to acquire scriptless testing software provider, AutonomIQ.  Sauce Labs announced in March, 2021 that it had acquired TestFairy, an Israeli-based company that provides a platform for developers to test and distribute beta versions of mobile applications. In July, 2021 the company completed the acquisition of Backtrace I/O Inc., a provider of production error monitoring and tracing for development and QA teams.

References

External links
 Official website

Software companies based in the San Francisco Bay Area
2008 establishments in California
Software companies established in 2008
Companies based in San Francisco